Dennis Manteit (born 18 February 1943 in Jandowae, Queensland) is an Australian former rugby league footballer who played in the 1960s and 1970s. In 2015, he was inducted into the Downlands College Hall of Fame for his success in international rugby league.

Career
Club

A Hervey Bay junior, Dennis Manteit played in Queensland for Brothers and in New South Wales initially for Canterbury-Bankstown for four seasons between 1970-1973 and then Balmain for three seasons between 1974 and 1976, whom he captained during his final year to win the 1976 Amco Cup. He retired at the end of the 1976 season. 

Representative

Dennis Manteit also played representative football for Queensland team on fifteen occasions between 1964-1969 and for the Australian national side on five occasions between 1967 and 1968. He is listed on the Australian Players Register as Kangaroo No. 414.  He played 4 tests on the 1967-68 Kangaroo Tour and one world cup match in 1968. He also toured with the Kangaroos on the New Zealand tour in 1969.

References

External links 
Queensland representatives at qrl.com.au

1943 births
Living people
Australian rugby league players
Canterbury-Bankstown Bulldogs players
Balmain Tigers players
Queensland rugby league team players
Past Brothers players
Australia national rugby league team players
Rugby league players from Queensland
Rugby league second-rows